Lamberto Ceserani (born 29 June 1953) is an Italian former ice dancer. Competing with Matilde Ciccia, he won the gold medal at the Italian Figure Skating Championships several times. They finished fifth at the 1975 World Championships and sixth at the 1976 Winter Olympics.

Results

References

1953 births
Italian male ice dancers
Figure skaters at the 1976 Winter Olympics
Olympic figure skaters of Italy
Living people
Place of birth missing (living people)